The following is a list of Spanish Civil War flying aces.

See also
Spanish Air Force
Aviación Nacional
Spanish Republican Air Force

Notes

External links 
 Aces of Civil war in Spain
 Spanish Civil War Air Aces - Spain

 
Flying aces
Lists of flying aces
Flying aces